59th Street is a crosstown street in the New York City borough of Manhattan, running from York Avenue and Sutton Place on the East Side of Manhattan to the West Side Highway on the West Side. The three-block portion between Columbus Circle and Grand Army Plaza is known as Central Park South, since it forms the southern border of Central Park. The street is mostly continuous, except between Ninth Avenue/Columbus Avenue and Columbus Circle, where the Time Warner Center is located. While Central Park South is a bidirectional street, most of 59th Street carries one-way traffic.

59th Street forms the border between Midtown Manhattan and Upper Manhattan. North of 59th Street, the neighborhoods of the Upper West Side and Upper East Side continue on either side of Central Park. On the West Side, Manhattan's numbered avenues are renamed north of 59th Street: Eighth Avenue (at Columbus Circle) becomes Central Park West; Ninth Avenue is renamed Columbus Avenue; Tenth Avenue is renamed Amsterdam Avenue; and Eleventh Avenue becomes West End Avenue.

Description 
59th Street forms the border between Midtown Manhattan and Upper Manhattan. The New York Times stated in 2004 that "Fifty-ninth Street stretches across Manhattan like a belt, with Central Park South as its fancy buckle." As with numbered streets in Manhattan, Fifth Avenue separates 59th Street into "east" and "west" sections.

59th Street is one-way westbound between the West Side Highway (at the Hudson River) and Ninth/Columbus Avenues. There is a one-block gap between Ninth/Columbus Avenues and Eighth Avenue/Central Park West at Columbus Circle. This section is occupied by Time Warner Center.

The portion of the street forming the southern boundary of Central Park from Columbus Circle on the west to Fifth Avenue on the east is known as Central Park South. Central Park South is largely bidirectional, except for the short block between Grand Army Plaza and Fifth Avenue, which is one-way eastbound. The block between Sixth Avenue and Grand Army Plaza contains a dedicated lane for westbound equestrian traffic. Entry into Central Park can be made at the Scholars' Gate at Fifth Avenue, the Artists' Gate at Sixth Avenue, the Artisans' Gate at Seventh Avenue, and the Merchants' Gate at Columbus Circle.

The section between Fifth Avenue and Second Avenue is one-way eastbound. At Second Avenue, 59th Street branches off onto the Ed Koch Queensboro Bridge, which is often referred to as the 59th Street Bridge. 59th Street continues east to York Avenue and Sutton Place, just short of the East River. The remaining two and a half blocks are bidirectional traffic; the westbound lane of 59th Street is funneled onto the Queensboro Bridge just east of the intersection with Second Avenue.

History 
59th Street was created under the Commissioners' Plan of 1811 as one of the minor east-west streets across Manhattan. The "59th Street" name initially applied to the entirety of the street between the Hudson and East Rivers. The addresses on Central Park South follow those of what had been West 59th Street.  

The construction of Central Park in the 1860s and 1870s led to the development of upscale hotels, apartments, and other institutions on this section of 59th Street in the late 19th and early 20th centuries. The original Plaza Hotel, the Hawthorne, and the Navarro Flats were all developed in the 1880s and 1890s, though all were subsequently demolished. The three blocks of 59th Street bordering Central Park were renamed after the park in 1896. During the first two decades of the 20th century, the new Plaza Hotel, the old New York Athletic Club building, and Gainsborough Studios were built on Central Park South. This was followed by 100 Central Park South, a new New York Athletic Club building, Barbizon Plaza, Hampshire House, Essex House, Hotel St. Moritz, and 240 Central Park South between World Wars I and II.

Historically, West 59th Street ran from Ninth/Columbus Avenues to Columbus Circle as well. In 1954, that city block of 59th Street was decommissioned to make way for the New York Coliseum complex. The Coliseum, in turn, was demolished and replaced with Time Warner Center in the early 2000s.

Transportation
59th Street is served by the following New York City Subway stations:
 59th Street–Columbus Circle
 Fifth Avenue–59th Street
 Lexington Avenue/59th Street

The Roosevelt Island Tramway terminates at Second Avenue near 59th Street and extends eastward to Roosevelt Island.

The New York Central Railroad's 59th Street station, a never-opened railroad station, exists on Park Avenue, which now carries the Park Avenue main line of the Metro-North Railroad. Currently, the station is used as an emergency exit for the Metro-North Railroad in the Park Avenue Tunnel.

Notable buildings

Bloomingdale's Department Store between Third and Lexington Avenues
Bloomberg World Headquarters between Third and Lexington Avenues
Trump Park Avenue, at Park Avenue
500 Park Avenue, at Park Avenue
59E59 Theaters, an Off-Broadway theater complex between Park and Madison Avenues
General Motors Building, southeast corner of Fifth Avenue
Formerly: Savoy-Plaza Hotel, southeast corner of Fifth Avenue
The Sherry-Netherland, northeast corner of Fifth Avenue
Formerly: Hotel New Netherland, northeast corner of Fifth Avenue
Plaza Hotel, southwest corner of Grand Army Plaza
Park Lane Hotel, 16 Central Park South
Ritz-Carlton, southeast corner of Sixth Avenue, flagship of the Ritz-Carlton chain
Trump Parc, southwest corner of Sixth Avenue
Hampshire House, 150 Central Park South
JW Marriott Essex House, 160 Central Park South
New York Athletic Club, southeast corner of Seventh Avenue
200 Central Park South, southwest corner of Seventh Avenue
220 Central Park South 
Gainsborough Studios at 222 Central Park South
240 Central Park South, southeast corner of Columbus Circle
2 Columbus Circle, south corner of Columbus Circle
Time Warner Center, west side of Columbus Circle
Mount Sinai West at 10th Avenue
Haaren Hall
Anya and Andrew Shiva Art Gallery, 524 West 59th Street
IRT Powerhouse fills the entire block between 58th to 59th Street, and from 11th to 12th Avenues.
Hudson River Park extends along the Hudson River from Battery Park to 59th Street.

See also

References
Notes

059
Midtown Manhattan